IL or Il may refer to:

Businesses and organizations
 Image-Line, a Belgian software company
 International League, Class Triple-A league in North American Minor League Baseball
 Ilyushin, a Russian aircraft manufacturer, whose aircraft are designated with "IL"
 Liberal Initiative, a political party in Portugal

Places
 İl, the term for 'province' in Turkey, see Provinces of Turkey
 Il, Iran, a village in Mazandaran Province, Iran
 Israel (ISO 3166-1 alpha-2 country code IL)
 Illinois (US postal abbreviation IL)
 Ilmenau, Thuringia, Germany (former vehicle plate code; newer plates use IK for Ilm-Kreis)

Science and technology
 Interlingua de Peano, a controlled language of Neo Latin used as an auxiliary language - not to be confused with Interlingua de IALA (IA), a constructed language

Biology, chemistry, and medicine
 Interleukin, a family of cytokines, in biochemistry
 Introgression line, in plant genetics
 Infralimbic prefrontal cortex nucleus
 Ionic liquid, in chemistry including pharmaceutics, and food science

Computing
 .il, the Internet Top Level Domain (TLD) code for Israel
 Internet Link protocol, developed originally as part of Plan 9 from Bell Labs
 Insert Line (ANSI), an ANSI X3.64 escape sequence
 Instruction list, an EC 61131-3 programming language
 Intermediate language, in computer science
 Common Intermediate Language, the compiled form of .NET code
 Common Language Infrastructure, originally named Microsoft Intermediate Language

Sports
 Injured list, a list of injured baseball players
 Interleague play in Major League Baseball

Other uses
 Il (Korean name), including a list of people with the name
 Il (Shugo Chara!), a character from the manga series Shugo Chara! by Peach-Pit
 International law
 IL (album), a 2016 album of French-Canadian pianist and composer Jean-Michel Blais
 Ugaritic spelling of the deity El
 Il, king of Umma, a Sumerian king, circa 2400 BCE
 IL, one way to write the Roman numeral for 49.
 IL, an abbreviation for the Israeli pound, the first currency of Israel